Notocelia culminana is a species of tortricid moth in the family Tortricidae.

The MONA or Hodges number for Notocelia culminana is 3211.

References

Further reading

External links

 

Eucosmini
Moths described in 1879